Valentin Olegovich Konovalov (: born November 30, 1987) is a Russian politician, who serves as Head of Khakassia since 2018. He was a local politician before assuming the statewide position.

A member of the Communist Party, he was supported by the right-wing LDPR party in his successful bid to unseat the incumbent Viktor Zimin of the ruling United Russia party, highlighting a rise in anti-establishment sentiment in the country during the period. Coordinated efforts to prevent him from winning the second round garnered national attention. Konovalov has described tackling corruption as the focus of his governorship.

Early life and education
Valentin Konovalov was born on November 30, 1987 in Okhotsk, Khabarovsk Krai.

Politics

In 2014, he was elected first Secretary of the Committee of the Abakan city branch of the Communist party.

In March 2018, he was elected First Secretary of the Committee (leader) of the Khakass Republican Branch of the Communist party.

In 2018, Konovalov participated in both the gubernatorial and parliamentary elections. He ran for the Supreme Council from the 4th single-mandate constituency. On September 9, he was elected to the Supreme Council of Khakassia and simultaneously entered the second round of gubernatorial election. His win coincided with the elections of Sergei Furgal and Vladimir Sipyagin, who also defeated United Russia incumbents in other regions. Furgal has since been imprisoned, and Sipyagin resigned.

2018 head of republic candidacy

On the website Pravda 19 passed a vote on the support of the national candidate of the Communist Party. About 5,000 people voted. The voting ended on June 16, 2018. The first secretary of the Communist Party of the Republic of Khakassia, Valentin Konovalov, received 46%, deputy to the Supreme Council, Oleg Ivanov, received 34%. The Communist Party decided to nominate Konovalov to the post of the Head of the Republic of Khakassia. 
On 21 June 2018, Valentin Konovalov was nominated as a candidate for Head of Khakassia from the Communist party.

In the election on 9 September took first place, gaining 44% and went to the second round. The second round was to be held on 23 September, in addition to Konovalov, the current head of the Republic Viktor Zimin was to participate, but he withdrew his candidacy a few days before the second round, which caused the vote to be postponed for two weeks. Instead of Zimin in the second round was to participate Andrey Filyagin, who took third place in the first round, but he also withdrew his candidacy a few days before the vote and the second round was again postponed for two weeks. Alexander Myakhar who took the fourth place in the first round had to participate in the second round, but he also refused to participate in the elections, and therefore the vote was postponed to 11 November. As there were no other candidates, in accordance with the Russian legislation, the second round had to be uncontested. Only Valentin Konovalov had to participate in the voting, and the voters had to vote "for" or "against" him. To win Konovalov had to gain more than 50% of the vote.

In 11 October 2018, the Chairman of Republican Election Commission Alexander Chumanin said that the election Commission of the Republic of Khakassia will appeal to the Supreme court of Khakassia Republic with a request to cancel registration on election of Valentin Konovalov. The Commission received a submission from the Prosecutor's office, which states that when submitting documents from Konovalov was, first, incorrectly stated the name of the branch of the party: in the documents it is called "Communist party of the Russian Federation-Khakass regional branch of the Communist party", while in the register of legal entities the party is registered as "Khakass regional branch of the Communist party of the Russian Federation". And secondly, according to Prosecutor's office, documents of party conference weren't certified by the head of regional office (which Konovalov is), and the presiding Secretary who conducted party conference.

The actions of the Republican Election Commission have caused criticism, including Central Election Commission Chairwoman Ella Pamfilova, who said that "the Republican Commission has sued itself to actually cancel the upcoming second round of election", and that "irreparable damage to the entire electoral process in the region may be caused". Under the law, it is possible to withdraw a registered candidate within 10 days, except in cases where there are newly discovered circumstances. Valentin Konovalov filed a counterclaim against the decision of the election Commission.

On 12 October, session of the Supreme Court of Khakassia, where the judge Valery Solovyev has postponed consideration of the claim for 15 October.

On 13 October, the interim Head of Khakassia Mikhail Razvozhayev, said he personally requested the Election Commission to withdraw the case from the Supreme Court to cancel the registration of Valentin Konovalov.

On 15 October, the Republican Election Commission decided to withdraw its claim from the Supreme Court to cancel the registration. The Supreme court of Khakassia also stopped consideration of the claim of the candidate for the head of Khakassia from the party of growth Alexander Mekhar to cancel the registration of Valentin Konovalov on the basis of the decision of the Election Commission, which recognized one of the videos of the Communist party violating the law. On 15 October, Alexander Myakhar announced the withdrawal of his claim.

On 11 November 2018, in the second round of elections, gaining more than 57% of the vote, Konovalov was elected Head of Republic.

Head of Khakassia

Inauguration

On 15 November 2018, Valentin Konovalov took the oath before the deputies of the Supreme Council of the Republic and judges of the Supreme Court of the Republic.

Government formation
The new government of Khakassia promised to make a coalition. It will be formed not on the principle of party affiliation, but on the basis of the professionalism of applicants for Ministerial posts. The formation will take place on a competitive basis. Probably, in addition to the Communist and Liberal Democratic parties (these parties agreed on coalitions in the three regions where the gubernatorial elections won their candidates) will be non-party and representatives of other parties, Konovalov did not rule out that the government may include members of United Russia.

Immediately after the inauguration, Konovalov held a meeting of the regional government, at which he dismissed the remaining Ministers and their deputies (13 high-ranking officials resigned from the government the day before). On the same day, Konovalov made his first appointment. Deputy of the Supreme Council of Khakassia, from United Russia Andrey Asochakov took the position of the First Deputy Head of Republic. Konovalov said he would coordinate finance and communication with the Russian federal government. Secretary of the Tula Regional Committee of the Communist party and mayor of Donskoy in the Tula Region Bogdan Pavlenko took the post of Deputy Head of Republic. Konovalov said Pavlenko would direct the apparatus of his administration and restructure the local government.

Tenure
Konovalov has described tackling corruption as the focus of his governorship.

Family
Valentin Konovalov is married. He has two daughters and a son.

Election history

References

|-

Living people
1987 births
Communist Party of the Russian Federation members
21st-century Russian lawyers
21st-century Russian politicians
People from Khabarovsk Krai
Heads of the Republic of Khakassia